Israel–Netherlands relations are foreign relations between Israel and the Netherlands. The Netherlands has an embassy in Ramat Gan, an information office in Jerusalem and two honorary consulates in Eilat and Haifa. Israel has an embassy in The Hague. Both countries are full members of the Union for the Mediterranean.

History

His majesty King Willem-Alexander of the Netherlands commemorated the long-lasting bonding between the Netherlands and the re-establishment of a Jewish homeland in Israel (President Shimon Peres' dinner 2013): “It was a Dutch banker from The Hague, Jacobus Kann, who made possible the purchase of the land on which the first modern districts of Tel Aviv were built, more than 100 years ago.” Jacobus Henricus Kann (1872-1944) was a Jewish Dutch banker and owner of the private bank NV Bankierskantoor van Lissa & Kann (ABN AMRO Bank), among his clientele were members of the Dutch royal family, a founder of Bank Otzar Hityashvut Hayehudim and Bank Anglo Palestine (Bank Leumi), and an affluent investor in companies as the Palestine Potash Limited (Dead Sea Works) and Frutarom. Kann sponsored many of Hertzel activities and the zionist conferences and purchased  the land for Achuzat Bait- the seed of Tel-Aviv. Kann arrived to Jerusalem for a third time in 1924 with his family and was nominated as the first Consul of the Netherlands in Jerusalem (1924–27). Kann died on October 7, 1944 in the Theresienstadt concentration camp.

In 1947, the Netherlands voted in favor of the United Nations Partition Plan for Palestine. Both countries established diplomatic relations in 1949.

The Netherlands was initially among the most supportive countries of Israel in Europe. It was one of the few countries to establish an embassy in Jerusalem, whereas most countries preferred placing their embassies in the Tel Aviv area until the final status of Jerusalem was resolved. Following the Six-Day War, the Dutch people raised about $4.2 million for Israel in donations. After the Soviet Union cut off diplomatic relations with Israel due to the Six-Day War, the Dutch Embassy in Moscow established an Israel interests' section which represented Israel in the Soviet Union until diplomatic relations were reestablished in January 1991. In 1973, during the Yom Kippur War, the Netherlands was one of only two European countries (the other being Portugal) that allowed American aircraft ferrying military equipment to Israel as part of Operation Nickel Grass to use its airbases. The Netherlands also supplied Israel with military equipment during the war, primarily engines, spare parts, and shells for its British-built Centurion tanks after the British government had imposed an arms embargo on Israel and thus cut off Israel's original source for this material, but also parts and munitions for light AMX tanks, artillery ammunition, and aircraft bombs. A number of Dutch truck drivers worked in Israel during the war to replace Israeli truck drivers who had been called up for military service.

In 1980, following the Jerusalem Law and a UN Resolution asking member states to withdraw their Jerusalem embassies in response, the Dutch government moved its embassy from Jerusalem. Dutch forces were deployed as part of the UNIFIL peacekeeping force in Lebanon, and during the 1982 Lebanon War, a unit of Dutch peacekeepers was one of the few UNIFIL units that attempted to obstruct the Israeli advance. The Dutch soldiers put up  obstacles that damaged two Israeli tanks, but the Israeli armored column ultimately forced its way through their position.

During the Gulf War in 1991, Iraq launched Scud missile attacks against Israel in the hopes of provoking an Israeli counterattack and thus rupturing the Coalition, which included Arab countries. Israel agreed not to attack Iraq in exchange for protection, and Coalition Patriot missile batteries were deployed in Israel to counter the Scud attacks. The Royal Netherlands Air Force deployed a patriot missile squadron to Israel and Turkey. The Dutch Defense Ministry later confirmed that the Patriot missiles had been largely ineffective, but the psychological value was high.

Diaspora
There were 29,800 Jews living in the Netherlands in 2017.

See also
 Foreign relations of Israel
 Foreign relations of the Netherlands 
 History of the Jews in the Netherlands
 Dutch people in Israel

References

External links

  Israeli embassy in The Hague
  Dutch Ministry of Foreign Affairs about relations with Israel (in Dutch only)
  Dutch embassy in Tel Aviv

 

 
Netherlands
Bilateral relations of the Netherlands